Michał Masłowski (born 19 December 1989) is a Polish professional footballer who plays as a midfielder for Gwardia Koszalin. On 18 January 2014 he made his debut for Poland national football team in a friendly match against Norway.

Career statistics

Club

1 Including Polish SuperCup.

Honours

Zawisza Bydgoszcz
 Polish Cup: 2013–14

Legia Warsaw
 Ekstraklasa: 2015–16
 Polish Cup: 2014–15, 2015–16

References

External links 
 

1989 births
Living people
Polish footballers
Association football midfielders
Poland international footballers
Zawisza Bydgoszcz players
Legia Warsaw players
Piast Gliwice players
HNK Gorica players
Zagłębie Sosnowiec players
Gwardia Koszalin players
Ekstraklasa players
I liga players
III liga players
First Football League (Croatia) players
Croatian Football League players
Expatriate footballers in Croatia
Polish expatriates in Croatia
People from Strzelin
Sportspeople from Lower Silesian Voivodeship